Fusca may refer to:

 Fusca of Ravenna (died c. 250), a child saint of the Roman Catholic Church
 Volkswagen Beetle, a 1938–2003 economy car (sold as the "Fusca" in Brazil)
 Volkswagen Beetle (A5), a 2011–2019 compact car (also sold as the "Fusca" in Brazil)